Pierre-Guillaume de Roux (25 February 1963 – 11 February 2021) was a French editor.

Biography
Born in Paris on 25 February 1963, his full name was Pierre Guillaume Louis Ferdinand Marie Michel Gédéon de Roux. His parents were writer and editor Dominique de Roux and Jacqueline Brusset. Pierre-Guillaume was a member of the directing committee of the Société des lecteurs de Dominique de Roux.

De Roux started his career in 1982 with  before becoming a producer with France Culture alongside . He collaborated with multiple publications such as Arthus, Contrepoint, Revue des deux Mondes, Latitudes, Le Quotidien de Paris, L'Appel, . In 1985, he was appointed literary director of Éditions de la Table ronde. In 1990, he was one of the founding members of Éditions Criterion of Média-Participations, where he would support the contemporary literary movement La Nouvelle Fiction. In 1992, he started working at Éditions Julliard, 25 years after his father had worked there.

In 1999, de Roux voiced his opposition to the Kosovo War signing the "Europeans want peace" petition. That same year, he founded Éditions des Syrtes alongside Serge de Pahlen. He left the publishing house in 2001. He served as literary director of Éditions du Rocher from 2001 to 2006, and left the publisher fully in 2008 following a disagreement over his editorial policies.

In July 2010, de Roux founded Éditions Pierre-Guillaume de Roux, which focused on publishing essays and historical nonfiction, as well as French, Italian, and Hungarian literature. He labeled himself a "right-wing editor", and was leading shareholder for all years of its existence so far other than 2015, when Charles Beigbeder held the title.

Pierre-Guillaume de Roux died following a long illness on 11 February 2021 at the age of 57, fourteen days short from his 58th birthday.

Authors published 
 Charles Beigbeder
 Alain de Benoist
 Roland Dumas
 Jean-Paul Gourévitch
 Roland Jaccard
 Gilles Lapouge
 Ludovine de La Rochère
 Robert Ménard
 Richard Millet
 Robert Poujade
 Dominique Venner
 Jacques Vergès

Decorations
Knight of the Ordre des Arts et des Lettres (2007)
Knight of the Order of the Star of Italy (2008)

References

1963 births
2021 deaths
Publishers (people) from Paris
French editors
Recipients of the Ordre des Arts et des Lettres
Recipients of Italian civil awards and decorations